Pickering High School is a public high school located in Leesville, Louisiana, United States. It is part of the Vernon Parish School Board.

Athletics
Pickering High athletics competes in the LHSAA.

References

External links
Pickering High School homepage

Educational institutions in the United States with year of establishment missing
Public high schools in Louisiana
Public middle schools in Louisiana
Schools in Vernon Parish, Louisiana